UGC 4879, which is also known as VV 124, is the most isolated dwarf galaxy in the periphery of the Local Group. It is an irregular galaxy at a distance of 1.38 Mpc. Low-resolution spectroscopy yielded inconsistent radial velocities for different components of the galaxy, hinting at the presence of a stellar disk. There is also evidence of this galaxy containing dark matter.

Appearance
UGC 4879 is a transition type galaxy, meaning it has no rings (Denoted rs). It is also a spheroidal (dSph) galaxy, meaning it has a low luminosity. It has little to no gas or dust, and little recent star formation. It is also irregular, meaning it has no specific form.

Gallery

References

External links

C2.staticflickr.com

Dwarf galaxies
Local Group
04879
Ursa Major (constellation)